Jonnalagadda may refer to:

Places
 Jonnalagadda, Guntur district, a village in the Guntur district of Andhra Pradesh, India

People
 Jonnalagadda Venkata Ramana Murthi (1933–2016), Indian stage and film actor
 Jonnalagadda Venkata Somayajulu (1928–2004), Indian actor known for his works in Telugu cinema and a few Tamil and Hindi films
 Jonnalagadda Gurappa Chetty (born 1937), Indian painter, craftsman and writer
 Siddu Jonnalagadda, Indian actor